"Into the Abyss" is a song by English gothic rock band Sex Gang Children. It was the band's first single and has been anthologized on many of their compilation albums. The B-side, "Dieche", was later remixed as a 12" single in 1984.

1982 singles
Sex Gang Children songs
1982 songs